Bernard McQuirt VC (1829 – 5 October 1888) was a British soldier born in Donaghcloney, County Down and was a recipient of the Victoria Cross, the highest and most prestigious award for gallantry in the face of the enemy that can be awarded to British and Commonwealth forces.

Details
He was about 29 years old, and a private in the 95th (Derbyshire) Regiment of Foot (later The Sherwood Foresters (The Nottinghamshire and Derbyshire Regiment) ), British Army during the Indian Mutiny when the following deed took place on 6 January 1858 at the capture of the town of Rowa, India for which he was awarded the VC:

Burial

McQuirt's memorial stone was erected in 1995 in an Anglican graveyard in Donaghcloney, where McQuirt was born. But his remains are not in this graveyard. McQuirt died in Erney Street off the Shankill Road, Belfast, 5 October 1888, and no one knew where he was buried. In 1993, an employee of Belfast City Council, Robert Burns, found McQuirt's registration and burial site in a Catholic plot of the Belfast City Cemetery. As there was no gravestone Burns contacted the Sherwood Foresters Museum in England and they proposed to pay for a stone. When Burns asked for permission to erect the stone in the graveyard the Catholic Church refused permission, claiming the plot was a poor plot with many other remains in the grave.

Bernard lived in obscurity at 72 Urney Street. Robert then approached the City Council for permission to erect the memorial stone on a wall in Urney Street (off Shankill Road) were Bernard McQuirt VC died in 1888. This was also rejected. Then Robert approached locals from Donaghcloney to erect the memorial stone in the local village square beside the World War I and World War II war memorial. This was also rejected. Finally a local Church of Ireland Minister offered Burns access to the local Donaghcloney Church graveyard to erect the memorial stone.

In 2000 a British Army colour party from a regiment based in Northern Ireland finally dedicated the stone in memory of Bernard McQuirt VC. The inscription on the stone states:
Sacred to the memory of Private Bernard McQuirt VC 95th The Derbyshire Regiment who won the regiment's first VC at ROWA CENTRAL INDIA 6th January 1858 he died 5 October 1888 "NINETY – FIVE"

References

Listed in order of publication year 
The Register of the Victoria Cross (1981, 1988 and 1997)

Ireland's VCs  (Dept of Economic Development, 1995)
Monuments to Courage (David Harvey, 1999)
Irish Winners of the Victoria Cross (Richard Doherty & David Truesdale, 2000)

External links
Location of grave and VC medal (Belfast, Northern Ireland)

Irish recipients of the Victoria Cross
Sherwood Foresters soldiers
People from County Armagh
1829 births
1888 deaths
19th-century Irish people
Irish soldiers in the British Army
Indian Rebellion of 1857 recipients of the Victoria Cross
British Army recipients of the Victoria Cross
Burials at Belfast City Cemetery
Military personnel from County Armagh